Kristine Jiménez (born 19 September 1995) is a Panamanian judoka who competes in the women's 52 kg category. She competed at the 2017 Judo Grand Prix Cancún and the 2021 World Judo Championships.

Jiménez qualified for the 2020 Summer Olympics.

References

External links
 

Living people
1995 births
Panamanian female judoka
Olympic judoka of Panama
Judoka at the 2020 Summer Olympics
Pan American Games medalists in judo
Central American and Caribbean Games gold medalists for Panama
Central American and Caribbean Games medalists in judo
Competitors at the 2018 Central American and Caribbean Games
Pan American Games bronze medalists for Panama
Medalists at the 2019 Pan American Games
Judoka at the 2019 Pan American Games